Backyard Wrestling is a fighting game developed by Paradox Development, and published by Eidos Interactive in 2003 for PlayStation 2 and Xbox.

Gameplay 

The goal of backyard wrestling is largely to use the environment to defeat an opponent. The gameplay could be better described as a cross between classic pro wrestling video games and 3D platform fighting like Power Stone.

Aside from the standard backyard locations, Backyard Wrestling'''s arenas include a truck stop, a slaughterhouse, an outdoor parking lot, a talk show set and a strip club. Each environment is littered with barbed wire-laden bats, fluorescent light bulbs, breakable tables, steel chairs and other objects players may use to injure their opponents.

The game has a "Story" like mode, entitled "Talk Show Mode" circling around a show called "Today's Topic", which resembles The Jerry Springer Show. The talk show host, a nameless character that resembles Kevin Gill, one of the game's creators, interviews different victims and personalities of backyard wrestling. After the interview, the character is placed where the victim is and will fight three other backyard wrestlers. They will face three opponents with one health bar.

 Roster 

Violent J
Shaggy 2 Dope
Mad Man Pondo
The Rudeboy
Josh Prohibition
M-Dogg 20
JCW's Evil Dead
Jamie Madrox
 Monoxide Child
 Sabu
Tom Dub
Masked Horn Dog
El Drunko
El Chicharron
Karnage
Gupta
Masked Mike Jackson
Sonny D. Chopper
Atrocity XXX
Commissioner
Dameon Redd
Da Bone Doctor
Josh Asbill
Tylene Buck
Kitana Baker
Sally
Jezebel
Rosie
Adrianne Pain
Hernia

 Reception Backyard Wrestling: Don't Try This at Home received "mixed or average" reviews on both platforms according to video game review aggregator Metacritic.  In Japan, Famitsu gave the PlayStation 2 version a score of 27 out of 40.

 Sequel 

A sequel to the game, titled Backyard Wrestling 2: There Goes the Neighborhood, was released in 2004 for PlayStation 2 and Xbox.

 References 

 Further reading 
 Archived game preview, from the April 2003 issue of Electronic Gaming Monthly''

External links 

2003 video games
Eidos Interactive games
Square Enix franchises
PlayStation 2 games
Xbox games
Multiplayer and single-player video games
Video games developed in the United States
Professional wrestling games
Video games using Havok